For Teayo, see:

 Mexico:
Teayo, Veracruz, a small village, and 
Castillo de Teayo, Veracruz, a larger village that serves as the municipal seat of:
Castillo de Teayo (municipality)
Castillo de Teayo (Mesoamerican site), pre-Columbian archaeological site and Mesoamerican pyramid